Vaios Tigas (born 16 October 1978) is a Greek athlete. He competed in the men's shot put at the 2000 Summer Olympics.

References

External links
 

1978 births
Living people
Athletes (track and field) at the 2000 Summer Olympics
Greek male shot putters
Olympic athletes of Greece
Athletes from Athens